Gentianella nitida is a species of plant in the Gentianaceae family.  It is one of two types of hercampuri, which is traditionally used in herbal medicine as an infusion, the other type of hercampuri being Gentianella alborosea.  Gentianella nitida has been used in Peruvian folk medicine since before the time of the Incas. These small shrubs are native to the high Andes of Peru. The Junin Province is a region of Peru that grows hercampuri.

Traditional use

The whole plant is used as an infusion. The roots are thin and yellow in color and the infusion of hercampuri also has a yellow color. Traditional uses of hercampuri include:
digestive
treatment of hepatitis 
treatment of varicose veins
reduction of blood cholesterol
treatment of hypertension

Chemical constituents
The infusion of hercampuri is one of the most bitter flavors of all herbs. The chemical compounds that give hercampuri its unique taste contribute to the bitterness of the infusion. Chemical constituents isolated from Gentianella nitida include amaronitidin and nitiol.

References

Further reading 

nitida
Medicinal plants of South America
Plants described in 1838